The 2014 Football League Trophy Final was the 31st final of the domestic cup involving League One and League Two teams. The final took place at Wembley Stadium in London on 30 March 2014 and saw Peterborough United beat Chesterfield 3–1, with Josh McQuoid, Shaun Brisley, Eoin Doyle and Britt Assombalonga all scoring goals. 35,663 spectators attended the match and Andy D'Urso was the referee.

Match

Statistics

References

2014
Events at Wembley Stadium
Chesterfield F.C. matches
Peterborough United F.C. matches
2014 sports events in London
2013–14 Football League